Jamie West is a Canadian politician, who was elected to the Legislative Assembly of Ontario in the 2018 provincial election. He represents the riding of Sudbury as a member of the Ontario New Democratic Party.

Prior to his election to the legislature, West worked for Vale Limited's smelter operation in Sudbury, and served as president of the Sudbury and District Labour Council. West also taught labour studies at Laurentian University.

Electoral record

References

Ontario New Democratic Party MPPs
21st-century Canadian politicians
Living people
Politicians from Greater Sudbury
Trade unionists from Ontario
Year of birth missing (living people)